José Lopes may refer to:

José Alberto Azeredo Lopes (born 1961), Portuguese politician
José dos Santos Lopes (1911–1996), Brazilian footballer
José Leite Lopes (1918–2006), Brazilian theoretical physicist
José Lopes da Silva (poet) (1872–1962), Cape Verdean poet